St. Mary Medical Center (SMMC) is a hospital in Long Beach, California, US.  It is currently operated by Dignity Health. SMMC has all private acute care rooms for patients.

Services
In December 1983, the emergency department at SMMC was designated as a level I trauma center for adults.  This was changed to level II in 1992.  SMMC has partnered with California State University, Long Beach to provide the only mental health trauma recovery center in Southern California.  The hospital also has a heart center, orthopedic institute, cancer center and pediatrics and maternity services.

History
In 1923, the Sisters of Charity of the Incarnate Word answered the call from Rev. J.M. Hegarty, pastor at St. Anthony's, to care for the sick and poor in Long Beach, by purchasing what is now St. Mary Medical Center from Dr. T.O. Boyd.

The building was damaged so significantly in the 1933 Long Beach earthquake that the entire building had to be razed and a new, 100-bed facility built on the site. The new hospital opened in 1937 and was financed by a Public Works Administration loan. It was designed by architect I.E. Loveless in the Art Deco style.

Catholic Healthcare West (now Dignity Health) acquired St. Mary Medical Center from the Sisters of Charity of the Incarnate Word in 1996.

See also
 Community Medical Center Long Beach
 Long Beach Memorial Medical Center

References

External links 

 
 This hospital in the CA Healthcare Atlas A project by OSHPD

Buildings and structures in Long Beach, California
Catholic hospitals in North America
Hospitals established in 1923
Hospitals in Los Angeles County, California
1923 establishments in California